Bolton Abbey may refer to:

 Bolton Abbey (village), North Yorkshire, England
 Bolton Abbey, estate owned by the Chatsworth Settlement, centred on the village of Bolton Abbey
 Bolton Abbey railway station, eastern terminus of the Embsay and Bolton Abbey Steam Railway
 Bolton Priory, the Priory Church of St. Mary and St. Cuthbert in the parish of Bolton Abbey
 Bolton Abbey, Moone, Ireland